"Dangerous" is a song by The Doobie Brothers, from their 1991 album Brotherhood with Patrick Simmons singing the lead vocal. The song deals with riding down a road where danger is surrounding the protagonist of the song at every turn. But the song tells that it's because of these dangers that the man continues to ride and loves every minute of it.

Writer Patrick Simmons included the lyric that the man in the song is riding a Harley-Davidson motorcycle, which is very common in the songs Simmons writes (he being fond of the brand of bikes himself).

References

1991 songs
1991 singles
The Doobie Brothers songs
Songs written by Patrick Simmons
Songs about transport
Song recordings produced by Rodney Mills